San José del Guaviare is a town and municipality in Colombia, capital of the department of Guaviare by the Guaviare River. It is home to some of the deisolated Nunak people.

References

External links

 Video of touristic places around San José del Guaviare
 San José del Guaviare official website
Encyclopædia Britannica; San José del Guaviare
 Sistema de Información Ambiental Territorial de la Amazonia colombiana SIAT-AC

Municipalities of Guaviare Department
Capitals of Colombian departments